Prinz Adrian Johannes Hynne, better known as Adrian Lux (born 1 May 1986), is a Swedish disc jockey and music producer. His biggest chart success is "Teenage Crime". Adrian Lux released his debut album on the 3rd of April, 2012. The self-titled album contains 12 tracks, including his previous singles "Teenage Crime", "Alive", "Fire" and "Burning", as well as a bonus track "Leave the World Behind". The album features several artists including Dante, Joakim Berg, And Then, Rebecca & Fiona, The Good Natured, and Lune.

His music has been showcased and remixed by several prominent DJs such as Avicii, Style of Eye, Philgood, Ali Payami, Marcus Schössow and Axwell. Lux has himself done remixes for Lana Del Rey, Deborah Cox, Basement Jaxx, Salem Al Fakir and Oskar Linnros.

On January 21, 2014, Adrian Lux and Cash Cash released a collaboration called “Bullet” on SoundCloud as a free download.

In popular culture
Adrian Lux's track "Can't Sleep" is featured in the video-game FIFA 11. Another track of his named "Wild Child" is also featured in the video game 2014 FIFA World Cup Brazil, both made by EA Sports.

"Damaged" appears in season 3 episode 16 of MTV's hit show Teen Wolf.

Lux starred alongside Albin Myers and Nause in the Swedish television programme Heartbeats on Tv6.

Discography

Studio albums

Extended plays
2008: Strawberry
2014: Make Out

Singles

Other songs
2010: "Strawberry"
2011: "Can't Sleep"
2012: "Fire"
2012: "Silence"
2013: "Wild Child"
2014: "Doge!"

References

External links

 Official website
 La Vida Locash
 Ultra Records

1986 births
Living people
Swedish DJs
Swedish record producers
Electronic dance music DJs